Orpheus Pledger (11 May 1993) is an Australian actor. He played Tycho Everson in the children's series Silversun, and appeared as Noah Parkin in Neighbours in 2011. From 2016 to 2019, Pledger starred as Mason Morgan in the Australian soap opera Home and Away.

Career
In 2002, an eight-year-old Pledger starred in writer-director Emma Freeman's short film Lamb. The following year, Pledger began appearing as Lewis Harfield in the drama series CrashBurn. Pledger starred as Tycho Everson in the science fiction children's series Silversun in 2004. Pledger has also made appearances in The Secret Life of Us, Welcher & Welcher, Scooter: Secret Agent and Nick Giannopoulos' film The Wannabes.

Pledger joined the cast of Neighbours as student Noah Parkin in 2011. Pledger's agent told him about the role and asked him to read through Noah's character notes. After deciding that he wanted the role, Pledger attended a screen test with the Neighbours casting director. After a recall, Pledger was told he had the role. He was contracted for six months. In 2014, Pledger appeared in the Nine Network television film Schapelle.

On 5 December 2015, Jonathon Moran of The Daily Telegraph reported Pledger had joined Home and Away as Mason Morgan. Pledger relocated from Melbourne to Sydney for filming. He choose to leave the role in 2019, and his character was killed off in the season finale on 27 November. 

In February 2022, Pledger took part in Season 3 of SAS Australia, but voluntarily withdrew after two days. He quit during a psychological evaluation with Ant Middleton and Doctor Dan to discuss his "erratic behaviour", after he was shown refusing to help out at the camp and receiving backlash from his fellow recruits.

Personal life
On 19 February 2021, Pledger was charged with possessing half a gram of Methylamphetamine and 30 tablets of Diazepam without a prescription. During the hearing at Melbourne Magistrates Court on 16 November, which Pledger did not attend, he accepted responsibility for the charges and was placed on a diversion program, which meant he did not have to enter a plea and was spared a criminal record. The Magistrate also ordered Pledger to be of good behaviour for six months, donate $150 to the court fund, complete a drug awareness course, and thank the officer who charged him.

Filmography

References

External links

Living people
Australian male soap opera actors
Australian male child actors
Australian male film actors
21st-century Australian male actors
1993 births
Male actors from Melbourne